The following is a list of books published by Astrid Lindgren, a Swedish author of children fiction.

Children and Youth Novels

Series

Individual Novels

Picture books

Series

Individual books

Other works

Not translated into English

Plays

Biographies

Autobiographical books

Other Biographies

Literature 
 Lars Bergtsson (2014): Bildbibliografi över Astrid Lindgrens skrifter 1921-2010. Sweden. Salikon förlag.

See also 
 Astrid Lindgren’s plays
 List of adaptations of works by Astrid Lindgren

References 

 
Bibliographies by writer
Bibliographies of Swedish writers
Children's literature bibliographies